Sayed Isma'el Balkhi was one of the most prominent Hazara reformist leaders in 20th-century Afghanistan. An innovative poet and well-known mystic, charismatic political leader and untiring reformist; Balkhi is undoubtedly the figurehead of modern Hazara history.

Life

Early life 
Sayed Ismael Balkhi was born in 1918 in Balkhab district, Sar-e Pol province in Northern Afghanistan. He received early education in Afghanistan after which he traveled to Iraq for further studies in Islamic theology and jurisprudence. At the time when Balkhi left the country, the Afghan government did not provide enough opportunities to the Hazara people in order to get appropriate education in the country. Balkhi was a Shia by religion and thus associated with the greater Hazara community. Balkhi was introduced to reformist movements popular at that time in the Middle East. He imported these intellectual enhancements to this motherland and started preaching it with a zeal unmatched in a country haunted by social ignorance and political isolation.

Career 
A religious activist, Balkhi was concerned during the liberal late 1940s period in Afghanistan, eventually becoming a political radical. In 1949, Balkhi plotted with at least five associates a coup d'etat against King Mohammad Zahir Shah (or, more specifically, an assassination attempt on Prime Minister Shah Mahmud Khan). The plan was foiled, and Balkhi spent some years in prison under the charges of conspiring to overthrow the monarchy and establish a republic. The dynamism of Balkhi's personality is that he got his education in an environment (i.e. Iraq) where clerics were either turned into radical revolutionaries like Khomeini and Khamenei or into self-absorbed mystics or study-oriented scholars. He was an exception among all such individuals. Ismael Balkhi was a mystic; he was heavily influenced by Mawlana Jalaluddin Balkhi but in the meantime, he was not unaware of his society. Similarly, Balkhi believed in political change but he never embraced any terrorist ideology or even internationalist approach. His patriotism and love for his country are evident in some poems he generated whilst in prison.

Balkhi gave the Afghans a message of freedom and democracy. He preached individual liberty among fellow Hazaras. He taught his kinsmen the absolute necessity of obtaining as much knowledge as possible and approach free of Shia-oriented Syed racism that somewhat existed in Afghanistan.

See also 
 List of Hazara people

References

External links 
 tasnimnews.com/در «پگاه بیداری»؛ درک و دریافتی از اشعار علامه سید اسماعیل بلخی

20th-century Afghan poets
Afghan politicians
1968 deaths
People from Sar-e Pol Province
1918 births
Hazara poets